Sebastian Ohlsson may refer to:

 Sebastian Ohlsson (footballer, born 1992), Swedish footballer for Trelleborgs FF
 Sebastian Ohlsson (footballer, born 1993), Swedish footballer for FC St. Pauli
 Sebastian Ohlsson (ice hockey) (born 1997), Swedish ice hockey player